Patan Assembly constituency of Maharashtra Vidhan Sabha is one of the constituencies located in the Satara district.

It is a part of the Satara (Lok Sabha constituency), along with five other assembly constituencies, viz Wai, Karad South, Koregaon, Satara and Karad North from the Satara district.

Members of Legislative Assembly
As a constituency of Bombay State:

Key

1962-2014
Key

   

1983-byepoll

Election results

Assembly elections 2014

See also

 List of constituencies of Maharashtra Legislative Assembly
 Patan

References

Assembly constituencies of Maharashtra
Satara district